Palpada furcata is a species of syrphid fly in the family Syrphidae.

References

External links

 

Eristalinae
Articles created by Qbugbot
Insects described in 1819
Taxa named by Christian Rudolph Wilhelm Wiedemann
Hoverflies of North America